†Cassiopidae is an extinct family of sea snails, marine gastropod molluscs in the superorder Cerithiimorpha

According to the taxonomy of the Gastropoda by Bouchet & Rocroi (2005) the family Cassiopidae has no subfamilies.

References

External links